Zabrus socialis is a species of ground beetle in the Pelor subgenus that can be found in Near East, former Yugoslavia and Turkey (Bursa).

Subspecies
There are two subspecies of Z. socialis:
 Z. socialis socialis Schaum, 1864
 Z. socialis werneri Ganglbauer, 1915

References

Beetles described in 1864
Beetles of Asia
Beetles of Europe
Taxa named by Hermann Rudolph Schaum